Fishguard (meaning "Mouth of the River Gwaun") is a coastal town in Pembrokeshire, Wales, with a population of 3,419 in 2011; the community of Fishguard and Goodwick had a population of 5,407. Modern Fishguard consists of two parts, Lower Fishguard and the "Main Town".  Fishguard and Goodwick are twin towns with a joint Town Council.

Lower Fishguard is believed to be the site of the original hamlet from which modern Fishguard has grown. It is in a deep valley where the River Gwaun meets the sea, hence the Welsh name for Fishguard. It is a typical fishing village with a short tidal quay. The settlement stretches along the north slope of the valley.

The main town contains the parish church, the High Street and most of the modern development, and lies upon the hill to the south of Lower Fishguard, to which it is joined by a steep and winding road. The west part of the town that faces Goodwick grew in the first decade of the 20th century with the development of Fishguard Harbour.

Etymology 
The English name Fishguard derives from Old Norse  meaning "fish catching enclosure", cognate with Modern English  + . In Welsh,  means "the mouth of the River Gwaun", the name of the river referring to the high, wet, level ground of a marsh or moor.

History

The coasts of Wales were subject to Norse raids during the Viking era, and in the latter part of the 10th century Norse trading posts and settlements emerged within Dyfed, with Fishguard established sometime between 950 and 1000 AD.

In 1078 Goodwick Moor, was the scene of a bloody battle in which Rhys, son of Owain ap Edwyn, was defeated and slain by Trahaearn ap Caradog (Brut y Tywysogion) in the Battle of Pwllgwdg,

The English place name indicates that there may have been a Scandinavian trading post, although no evidence has been found. However the "V" shaped stone structures of ancient fish traps can still be seen at low tide on both sides of the bay and it is believed these were the foundations for wooden fences that would trap the fish as the tide went out. Other examples can be found around the country and they probably date from Saxon times, though similar devices have been in use since Neolithic times.

Called Fiscard until the turn of the 19th century when the name was Anglicised, Fishguard was a marcher borough and in 1603 was described as one of five Pembrokeshire boroughs overseen by a portreeve. The Norman settlement lay along what is now High Street between the church at its north end and the remains of a Norman motte at its south end.

In 1912, Denys Corbett Wilson made the first flight between Britain and Ireland. Starting his journey from Hendon aerodrome on 17 April 1912, he eventually landed in Goodwick on 21 April having made a few unscheduled stops along the way. He then set off from a field near Harbour Village at 5:47 on 22 April and crash-landed 100 minutes later in Crane near Enniscorthy in County Wexford.

Lower Fishguard developed as a herring fishery and port, trading with Ireland, Bristol and Liverpool. In the late 18th century it had 50 coasting vessels, and exported oats and salt herring. In 1779, the port was raided by the privateer Black Prince, which bombarded the town when the payment of a £1,000 ransom was refused. As a result, Fishguard Fort was completed in 1781, overlooking Lower Fishguard. The port declined in the latter half of the 19th century.

Fishguard's ancient Royal Oak public house was the site of the signing of surrender after the Battle of Fishguard. This brief campaign, on 22–24 February 1797, is the most recent landing on British soil by a hostile foreign force, and thus is often referred to as the "last invasion of mainland Britain". A force of 1,400 French soldiers landed near Fishguard but surrendered two days later.

A 19th-century vicar of Fishguard, the Rev. Samuel Fenton MA, wrote the book The History of Pembrokeshire.

The ancient Parliamentary Borough of Fishguard was contributory to the Borough of Haverfordwest. During the Second World War, the Fishguard Bay Hotel was Station IXc of Special Operations Executive where submersibles were tested in Fishguard Bay.

Fishguard & Goodwick Golf Club was founded in 1921 and closed in the 1960s.

Governance

There are two tiers of local government covering Fishguard, at community (town) and county level: Fishguard and Goodwick Town Council and Pembrokeshire County Council. The town council is based at Fishguard Town Hall in Market Square.

Fishguard was an ancient parish. When parish and district councils were established in 1894, the parish of Fishguard was included in the Haverfordwest Rural District. In 1906 it was decided to create an urban district covering Fishguard, making it independent from the Haverfordwest Rural District Council. The whole parish of Fishguard was considered too large to be an urban district and so it was split into two parishes: Fishguard North covering the main built up area, to be governed by Fishguard Urban District Council, and Fishguard South which stayed in the Haverfordwest Rural District. These changes took effect on 1 April 1907. The first meeting of Fishguard Urban District Council was held on 8 April 1907 at the Town Hall, when John Robertson Richards, a Conservative, was appointed the first chairman of the council.

The urban district was enlarged in 1934 to include neighbouring Goodwick, becoming Fishguard and Goodwick Urban District. Fishguard and Goodwick Urban District was abolished  under the Local Government Act 1972, with the area becoming part of the district of Preseli Pembrokeshire on 1 April 1974. A community covering the former urban district was established at the same time, with its council taking the name Fishguard and Goodwick Town Council. Preseli Pembrokeshire was abolished in 1996 to become part of a re-established Pembrokeshire.

Geography

The town is situated at the back of a north facing bay known as Fishguard Bay which offers protection from waves generated by prevailing westerly winds. It has a relatively mild climate due to its coastal position. The winds coming from the west or south-west have a determining influence on temperature and precipitation. There is an islet in Fishguard Bay, Needle Rock which reaches 131 feet (40 metres).

Wildlife around Fishguard is rich with a wide variety of colourful wild flowers and sea mammals including the grey seal, porpoises and dolphins. The local birdlife include Eurasian curlew, common redshank and sanderling regularly foraging in the lower Fishguard Harbour and European stonechat, great cormorant and northern fulmar can be seen from the coastal path.

Demography
According to the United Kingdom Census 2001, Fishguard had 3,193 inhabitants and 1,465 households. In 2001, 39.8% of the population could speak Welsh. This compares with 58.9% in 1951 and 90.3% in 1901. The population of 3,193 breaks down as follows:

Landmarks
Outside Fishguard there is a stone monument commemorating the signing of the Peace Treaty after the last invasion of Britain in 1797. Women dressed in Welsh costume are said to have startled the invaders. The 19th-century parish church of St Mary's contains a memorial stone to the heroine Jemima Nicholas, who helped repel the French invasion. There is also a Bi-Centenary memorial stone monument in West Street, Fishguard to commemorate the invasion. A tapestry was created in 1997 to commemorate the invasion and is on display to the public in Fishguard Town Hall.

There are more than 80 listed buildings in and around the town.

Community and culture
Fishguard has hotels and is the main shopping town of North Pembrokeshire with a market in the town hall on Tuesdays, Thursdays and Saturdays.

Fishguard has a Round Table doing community work including running the Fishguard & Goodwick Carnival and the Fishguard Autumn Festival.

The Gwaun Lodge of the Royal Antediluvian Order of Buffaloes, is a charitable organisation within the community who host sponsored events and other community works throughout the year.

Fishguard has a 180-seat cinema/theatre called Theatr Gwaun which provides a venue for film, music and live theatre and hosted the National Eisteddfod in 1936 and 1986.

Transport

Fishguard is the terminus of the London to Fishguard Trunk Road (A40). A regular ferry operated by Stena Line leaves for Rosslare in Ireland from the port of Fishguard Harbour, Goodwick. Following the Brexit withdrawal agreement, freight traffic from Rosslare fell by 50% in January 2021.

Rail services are operated by Transport for Wales Rail from Fishguard Harbour and Fishguard and Goodwick railway stations on the West Wales line to Swansea and Cardiff. Through trains to London were withdrawn in 2004.

Starting in 1909 the fast Cunard liners from New York began anchoring at Fishguard to allow passengers to take a Great Western train to London, saving a few hours compared to Liverpool.

In the media

Lower Fishguard was used as "Llareggub" in the film of Dylan Thomas's Under Milk Wood, starring Richard Burton, Elizabeth Taylor and Peter O'Toole. Many local people were involved in the production of this film as background characters. The film Moby Dick (starring Gregory Peck) was filmed there in 1955.

Business
Fishguard and Goodwick Chamber of Trade and Tourism is a business support group.

Notable people
See :Category:People from Fishguard
 Jemima Nicholas, armed only with a pitchfork, single-handedly captured 12 French soldiers in 1797.
 Willie Thomas (1866–1921), rugby player
 Arthur Wade-Evans (1875–1964), historian
 Sue Jones-Davies, actress and singer, attended Fishguard County Secondary School during the 1960s.
 Mark Delaney, footballer, grew up in Fishguard.
 Cerys Matthews, lead singer of Catatonia went to Ysgol Bro Gwaun.

Twinning
Fishguard is twinned with  Loctudy in Brittany, France.

See also
 Fishguard Folk Festival
 Fishguard Lifeboat Station

References

External links

 historic-uk.com An historic account of Fishguard

 
Towns in Pembrokeshire
Coast of Pembrokeshire
Fishguard and Goodwick
Populated coastal places in Wales